The Darwinners is an animated television series based on the Silex and the City comic created by French cartoonist Jul. The show attracted an audience of 1.3 million viewers. A  film adaptation was announced for 2023.

Synopsis
The show is set in a comical version of the Stone Age, featuring the Dotcoms, a stone age family.

Cast

Clément Sibony
Arnaud Montebourg

References

2012 French television series debuts
French-language television shows
2010s French animated television series

Animated television series about families
Prehistoric people in popular culture
Television shows adapted into comics
Television shows adapted into films
Television series set in prehistory
Television series about cavemen